The Jaquar Group, established in 1960, is a bathroom and lighting company, offers faucets, showers, shower enclosures, sanitary ware, flushing systems, wellness products, concealed cisterns, water heaters, and varied lighting products.

It employs over 12,000 people including 1200 service technicians and runs 8 manufacturing facilities with 1 in South Korea. Currently, it manufactures 39 million bath fittings every year for nearly 2.4 million bathrooms every year, delivering 2.5 million sanitary ware pieces annually and 9.9 million lighting products yearly. The company has 21 orientation centres in India and 22 Jaquar World stores globally at London, Milan, Singapore, Dubai, Kuala Lampur and other locations.
Jaquar Group has global headquarters spread across 48,000 sq. meters) in Manesar, Haryana, India and presently operates in over 55 countries in Europe, Middle East, South East Asia, Africa, and SAARC region.

History

1960–1985
1960
Mehras started the business, Rajesh Mehra's father NL Mehra started the bath fittings company and brand Essco.
1972
Essco started its first manufacturing plant in Haryana, and after three years rolled out a design range of bathroom fittings under the sub-brand Deluxe.
1975
Launch of Delux, the first designed faucet by Jaquar in India.
1985
Launch of Marvel, first collection of bathroom fittings from Jaquar in India.

1986–2009
1986
Rajesh Mehra along with brothers Ajay Mehra and Krishan Mehra launched the Jaquar brand.  It is named after Jai Kaur, the grandmother of the Mehra brothers.
1987
Jaquar launched the advanced flush valve, making Jaquar largest selling brand in its category in India.
1993
Introduced Victorian design ‘Queen’ brand.
2000
Expands the range of offerings to whirlpools, shower panels, showers, steam cabins and spas.
2001
Jaquar's first Orientation Centre opens its doors to the public – a retail place where company's latest bathroom and lighting products and concepts are showcased, and advice from the experts is also offered, in addition to estimation and design assistance. Jaquar is the only Indian bath brand that has live display and demonstration at its 21 Orientation Centers. 
2006
 Launch of a separate division for shower enclosures from designing to installation.
2007
Jaquar builds its first manufacturing fully integrated unit at Bhiwadi.
2008 
 Jaquar Group builds its second manufacturing facility.
2009
Forays into water heaters, the launch of ‘Artize’

2010–2015
2010
The Group introduced a range of sanitaryware products. The third manufacturing plant was scaled up to 135,000 sq. m that becomes one of the largest plant in Asia
2013
Nielsen survey reports Jaquar as India’s most trusted bath fittings brand

2016
Jaquar Group acquired a 51% majority stake in Joeyforlife—a South Korea-based luxury shower maker—in a deal worth 1.2 million. 
The company has also entered the lighting industry and has launched a manufacturing unit for the same in Manesar.
 Jaquar makes a new global headquarter, (a Platinum LEED Certified Net zero-energy building by USGBC building in Manesar

2017
Jaquar acquires sanitaryware manufacturing plant taking its production capacity to 1.8 million pieces. 
Jaquar Group's manufacturing units were spread over 3,29,000 sq. m, across 5 plants in India & 1 plant in South Korea. 
Jaquar expanded its manufacturing facility in Bhiwadi, Rajasthan by 30,000 square meters by investing 150 crore in new faucets manufacturing plant which helped the Group to achieve the production to 1,25,000 faucets a day. With the expansion of Bhiwadi plant it has become the world's largest faucet manufacturing plant in a single unit. Jaquar's Bhiwadi plant recycles 1.5 lakh litres of water every day

2018
The Group announced the skill development and training of over 300 plumbers on World Youth Skill Day as a part of Skill India, an initiative by Government of India. The training will be imparted to the plumbers through 10 specialized training centres spread across India. The centres will train unemployed youth in specialized skill sets and develop them as trained plumbers.
The Group closed the turnover of INR 3588 Crores in 2018-19 and aims to achieve $1 billion turnover by 2022 and open 15 stores globally.
2019
Rajesh Mehra, Director, and Promoter of Jaquar Group was conferred the 'EY Entrepreneur of the Year 2018' Award under the ‘Consumer Products & Retail’ category for Delivering luxurious experiences.
Jaquar Group received the second Leadership in Energy and Environmental Design (LEED) Platinum certification for its bath fittings manufacturing facility in Bhiwadi, Rajasthan, India.
Mr. Rajesh Mehra was ranked 93rd in the Forbes India's list of 100 Richest People in 2019 Ranking.
Jaquar group completed 60 years in manufacturing excellence.

2020
Jaquar opens the 15th Jaquar World showroom in Moscow that is designed by the Danelon Meroni design studio and showcases product ranges from Artize and Jaquar.
 Opens in-house manufacturing for LED lighting with 900000 sq. ft plant in Bhiwadi.

2021
 Jaquar launches the Sonipat water heater facility.
 Jaquar Group unveiled Jaquar World store in Lagos, Nigeria.

2022
 Jaquar Group launches Laguna in collaboration with Matteo Thun and Antonio Rodrigues
 Launch of ATELIER by Artize, a bath gallery at Mumbai, India

Products

All manufacturing plants are zero liquid discharge with recycling more tha 500,000 litres of water everyday and recycling 4221 metric tones of brass every year, generating 6.23 MW of solar energy.Jaquar Group targets its products to various socio-economic segments, such as brand Artize (luxury category), brand Jaquar (Premium category) and brand Essco (value category).

Artize
Artize is a luxury bathroom shower and faucets brand from Jaquar Group. In July 2018, the Tailwater faucet, manufactured by the Jaquar Group's luxury brand Artize, and designed by the London-based product design consultancy DanelonMeroni Design Studio received Red Dot Design Award for 2018 for product design.

Turnover figures (INR)
Year 19/20: 107 Cr
Year20/21: 101 Cr

Jaquar

The Jaquar brand is a player in the premium segment of the Indian bathroom fittings market.
It manufactures shower enclosures and cubicles.
The company's range of products also includes faucets, showers, sanitary ware and wellness, shower enclosures, and water heaters.

Turnover figures (INR)
Year 19/20: 2857 Cr
Year20/21: 200769 Cr

Faucets 
Jaquar has in-house product design team, the Group has manufacturing capacity of producing 125,000 faucets per day.

Showers 
Jaquar showers have overhead, hand and body showers systems.

Sanitaryware 
Jaquar Sanitaryware ranges include wash basins, offering Wall Hung, Over Counter, Under Counter and Counter-top installations.

Wellness 
Jaquar has range of whirlpools that are created by specialist designers from Europe and are manufactured at Jaquar’s manufacturing facilities.

Water heaters

Essco
Essco by the Jaquar Group offers taps, sanitaryware, and accessories, has a retail footprint of over 4000 in the country and an annual turnover of over Rs 300 crores. 
For over six decades Essco the bathroom brand has been in the bath industry in India. Essco, the brand is built on the pillars of quality and affordability in designing and delivering products that are functional, and aesthetics at an easy–to-own price. Essco has expanded its footprint in tier-II, III & IV cities across India, Essco has a total retail presence across 4000+ stores and the Jaquar Group aims to increase the retail strength to 5000+ outlets by the year 2022.
Essco unveiled digital campaign Hashtag EsscoNaBhoolPaoge highlighting the values of quality and trusted service.

Turnover figures (INR)
Year 19/20: 306 Cr
Year20/21: 340 Cr

Jaquar lighting
The group is investing Rs 150 crore in a new lighting manufacturing facility where many lighting components would be produced in-house. Jaquar's capacity to make LED drivers is about 1.2 million a month. It currently produces around 750,000. The company first invested in lighting 15 years back when it identified a vacuum in good quality lighting. Since then, it has focussed on designer lighting such as chandeliers. The company also manufactures bulbs and tube lights - it has automated bulbs assembly at its factory in Manesar. Jaquar Group announced the Indian film actress Deepika Padukone as the brand ambassador of their lighting segment.

Turnover figures (INR)
Year 19/20: 270 Cr
Year20/21: 167 Cr

Training
Jaquar Group aims to train over 10,000 more plumbers by 2020.

Group's existing plumber training and customer service initiative; 63,000 plumbers have been trained through PAD (Plumber Associated with Dealers) and 2,000 unskilled personnel have been trained through Jaquar Group skill development centres.

References

Manufacturing companies of India